Brittney Sykes (born February 7, 1994) is an American professional basketball player with the Washington Mystics of the Women's National Basketball Association (WNBA). She was drafted with the seventh overall pick in the 2017 WNBA draft.

Sykes became the highest drafted Orange women's basketball player in school history.

Background
Sykes is the daughter of Michael and Regina and has two older brothers. She graduated from Syracuse University with a bachelor's degree in Communications and Rhetorical Studies. She also achieved her Master's in instructional design, development, and evaluation in the School of Education.

High school
In high school, Sykes was a 4-star recruit. She played the position of guard at University High School in Newark, New Jersey. Along with her high school team, she played for a club team that goes by the name of the Philly Belles. Through her play on both teams, Sykes earned 95 overall scouting grade for her playing, was ranked 31st out of all college recruits and was ranked 9th out of all of the recruits at her position (according to ESPN scouting reports). Her high school achievements include being a 2012 United States U18 national team member,a 2012 McDonald's All-American, Named 2012 USA Today All-USA Second Team, All-Tri-State Second Team, North-South Game MVP, All-State, All-Essex County First Team. In her high school career, she averaged 18.9 points, 12.9 rebounds, 3.6 assists as a senior. Her abilities led University High School to the Essex County Championship in 2011–12. In addition to her achievements on the court, Sykes was a member of the National Honor Society, student cabinet, and MSG Varsity Club.
She graduated with the class of 2012 with the intent of playing for the Syracuse Orange in Syracuse, NY. Although she decided to accept the offer to play at Syracuse University, she also was sought after by Georgetown, Penn State, and Notre Dame.

College
Sykes attended Syracuse University. She was at the college for five years. She only played in four of those seasons due to a knee injury in her third season. She played both the shooting guard and small forward positions in her four seasons. She played a total of 138 games during her college career (started in 137 of those games), averaged 29.5 minutes per game, 1.9 assists per game, 5.9 rebounds, 13.4 points per game, and a total of 1846 career points, 85 blocks, and 266 steals. She ended her college career by becoming the number three ranked SU women's basketball for career points scored and earned All-American honors, and the title of the winningest Syracuse Orange women's basketball player with a total of 101 wins.
College Stats

Syracuse statistics

Source

Injuries
In the span of her 2013-2014 and 2014–2015 seasons at Syracuse University, Sykes suffered two ACL tears. She tore her ACL the first time on March 22, 2014 in the NCAA Tournament in Lexington, KY. After 10 long months of rigorous therapy and recovery, Sykes was able to return to play in the 2014–2015 season. On January 4, 2015 (approximately 43 minutes into her season),Sykes tore her ACL yet again in her third game back against Notre Dame. Although these injuries set her back, she still views them as stepping stones to becoming both a stronger player and a stronger person.

WNBA
After being drafted to the Atlanta Dream with the seventh pick of the 2017 WNBA draft, Sykes completed a very successful rookie year. She signed a three-year deal that starts with a base salary of $47,738 in the first year, jumps to $48,693 in the second, $53,563 in the third and $60,867 in a fourth-year option (typical rookie contract). Sykes plays both the shooting guard and small forward positions on the Dream, just like she did for Syracuse. She achieved rookie of the month for both July and August and was the runner up for rookie of the year with 10 out of the 40 sportswriter votes (winner, Allisha Gray of the Dallas Wings received 30 of the votes). She also was given WNBA all rookie team honors for her 2017 season. She averaged 13.9 points per game and her 471 points was a single season record by a Dream rookie and had a game high of 33 points against Phoenix. Also, Sykes started 23 games out of the 34 games she played (there are 34 games in the regular season in the WNBA). Overall, she had a great first year of WNBA play.

WNBA career statistics

Regular season

|-
| style="text-align:left;"| 2017
| style="text-align:left;"| Atlanta
| 34 || 23 || 25.4 || .408 || .336 || .729 || 4.1 || 1.9 || 0.6 || 0.5 || 1.7 || 13.9
|-
| style="text-align:left;"| 2018
| style="text-align:left;"| Atlanta
| 29 || 7 || 20.7 || .411 || .268 || .663 || 3.5 || 2.3 || 0.3 || 0.6 || 1.1 || 9.7
|-
| style="text-align:left;"| 2019
| style="text-align:left;"| Atlanta
| 34 || 27 || 25.9 || .365 || .259 || .703 || 4.4 || 2.5 || 0.6 || 0.5 || 2.0 || 10.2
|-
| style="text-align:left;"| 2020
| style="text-align:left;"| Los Angeles
| 21 || 14 || 24.6 || .487 || .327 || .806 || 2.6 || 2.1 || 1.5 || 0.3 || 1.7 || 10.1
|-
| style="text-align:left;"| 2021
| style="text-align:left;"| Los Angeles
| 32 || 20 || 29.3 || .405 || .262 || .772 || 4.6 || 2.2 || 1.8 || 0.5 || 1.4 || 9.4
|-
| style="text-align:left;"| 2022
| style="text-align:left;"| Los Angeles
| 32 || 24 || 28.8 || .433 || .269 || .770 || 3.7 || 3.7 || 2.0 || 0.7 || 2.6 || 12.7
|-
| style='text-align:left;'| Career
| style='text-align:left;'| 6 years, 2 teams
| 182 || 115 || 25.9 || .411 || .289 || .736 || 3.9 || 2.5 || 1.1 || 0.5 || 1.8 || 11.1

Postseason

|-
| style="text-align:left;"| 2018
| style="text-align:left;"| Atlanta
| 5 || 5 || 27.0 || .473 || .412 || .500 || 3.6 || 1.6 || 0.8 || 0.2 || 1.8 || 12.6
|-
| style="text-align:left;"| 2020
| style="text-align:left;"| Los Angeles
| 1 || 1 || 22.0 || .273 || .000 || 1.000 || 5.0 || 2.0 || 0.0 || 0.0 || 3.0 || 8.0
|-
| style='text-align:left;'| Career
| style='text-align:left;'| 2 years, 2 teams
| 6 || 6 || 26.2 || .439 || .333 || .600 || 3.8 || 1.7 || 0.7 || 0.2 || 2.0 || 11.8

USA Basketball
Due to her performance in her rookie season, Sykes was named to the 2018-20 national team pool on March 14, 2018. Sykes also participated in 2012 USA U18 and 2013 USA U19 National Team trials before the start of her professional career.

International
In addition to her WNBA team, Sykes is also a member of an international team, like many other WNBA players, during the WNBA offseason. Sykes is a member of the Israeli team in Petah Tikva which is a part of the Israeli Female Basketball Premier League. She plays on the team with her former Syracuse University teammate, Alexis Peterson, who played for the Seattle Storm in her 2017 WNBA rookie season and now plays for the Indiana Fever.

References

1994 births
Living people
American women's basketball players
Atlanta Dream draft picks
Atlanta Dream players
Basketball players from Newark, New Jersey
Guards (basketball)
LGBT basketball players
LGBT people from New Jersey
Lesbian sportswomen
Los Angeles Sparks players
Syracuse Orange women's basketball players